The 2022–23 St. Francis Brooklyn Terriers men's basketball team represented St. Francis College in the 2022–23 NCAA Division I men's basketball season. The Terriers, led by 13th-year head coach Glenn Braica, opened the season as members of the Northeast Conference, playing their final two home games at Daniel Lynch Gymnasium in Brooklyn Heights, New York. On November 30, 2022, the Terriers temporarily began playing their home games at the Pratt Activity Resource Center, frequently called the Pratt ARC, on the main Brooklyn campus of Pratt Institute, due to St. Francis College's move to its new campus on Livingston Street.

The Terriers finished the season 14–6, 7–9 in NEC play to finish in a tie for seventh place. As the No. 7 seed in the NEC Tournament, they lost to Fairleigh Dickinson in the quarterfinals.

Previous season
The Terriers finished the 2021–22 season 10–20, 7–11 in NEC play to finish in sixth place. As the 5 seed, they were defeated by 4 seed Mount St. Mary's in the quarterfinals of the NEC Tournament.

Roster

Schedule and results

|-
!colspan=12 style=| Regular season

|-
!colspan=9 style=| NEC Tournament

Sources

References

St. Francis Brooklyn Terriers men's basketball seasons
Saint Francis Brooklyn
Saint Francis Brooklyn Terriers men's basketball
Saint Francis Brooklyn Terriers men's basketball